Alcohol packaging warning messages (alcohol warning labels, AWLs) are warning messages that appear on the packaging of alcoholic drinks concerning their health effects. They have been implemented in an effort to enhance the public's awareness of the harmful effects of consuming alcoholic beverages, especially with respect to foetal alcohol syndrome and alcohol's carcinogenic properties. In general, warnings used in different countries try to emphasize the same messages (see By country). Such warnings have been required in alcohol advertising for many years, although the content of the warnings differ by nation.

A World Health Organization report, published in 2017, stated:

A 2014 study in BMC Public Health concluded that "Cancer warning statements on alcoholic beverages constitute a potential means of increasing awareness about the relationship between alcohol consumption and cancer risk."

In many countries, alcoholic beverage packages are not required to have the information about energy and nutritional content required of all other foods and drinks, .

History 
Increasing calls for the introduction of warning labels on alcoholic beverages have occurred after tobacco packaging warning messages proved successful. The addition of warning labels on alcoholic beverages is historically supported by organizations of the temperance movement, such as the Woman's Christian Temperance Union, as well as by medical organisations, such as the Irish Cancer Society. The impetus to add alcohol packaging warning messages to containers of alcoholic beverages "reflect[s] a growing evidence base relating to the relationship between alcohol consumption and a range of health problems including cancer, diabetes, cardiovascular disease, overweight and obesity, liver disease, fetal abnormalities, cognitive impairment, mental health problems, and accidental injury". Even light and moderate alcohol consumption increases cancer risk in individuals. As of 2014, alcohol warning labels are required in many countries, including Brazil, Colombia, Costa Rica, France, Guatemala, Mexico, Russia, South Africa, Taiwan, Thailand, and the United States. Modern alcohol advertising promotes alcoholic beverages heavily "as though it was not a toxic substance". The alcohol industry has tried to actively mislead the public about the risk of cancer due to alcohol consumption, in addition to campaigning to remove laws that require alcoholic beverages to have cancer warning labels.

Cancer warnings
The World Health Organization declared alcohol a Class I carcinogen in 1990. Despite unequivocal scientific evidence, only South Korea had AWLs that warned of the link. The alcohol industry has lobbied hard against any measure that could lead to greater public awareness of the link between alcohol and cancer. These include preventing, delaying, and weakening AWL legislation.

Lobbying methods
Alcohol producers object strongly to warning labels saying that alcohol causes cancer. They object more to warnings that are more graphic and those which are reuired to be in a prominent position on the bottle; given the choice, they hide the warnings as inconspicuously as possible. Lobbyists generally do not object to legislation requiring warnings about drunk driving, underage drinking, or fetal alcohol syndrome.

Industry has sometimes argued that integrating warnings into the main label is too expensive, and should be banned. They prefer supplementary stick-on labels, with placement to be chosen by manufacturers, so that it does not interfere with the main label or detract from it. They then choose the most inconspicuous placement. Governments have opposed this.

Countermeasures in trade agreements
The alcohol industry has also taken to using international trade and investment law to slow the implementation of warning labels, introducing provisions into international agreements that forbid some types of warning labels. This allows them to threaten litigation under these international agreements, creating chilling effects. Even if their cases are thrown out, litigating in national, international, and supernational forums delays action and makes it much more expensive. In 2010, Thai legislation requiring alcohol warning labels was blocked in the World Trade Organization (WTO): alcohol-exporting countries, including Australia, the European Union, New Zealand and the United States, argued that a label mandate was a "technical barrier to trade". Since then, there has been similar WTO opposition to warning labels proposed by Kenya, India, Ireland, Israel, Korea, Mexico, South Africa and Turkey.

These tactics have previously been used by the tobbacco industry to oppose tobbacco warning labels and plain packaging requirements. The tobacco industry has lost some lawsuits, but Australia had to fight litigation to the highest Australian court, and before the World Trade Organization, and before an international tribunal. Uruguay, facing litigation from companies richer than it is, was only able to fight industry lawsuits and persist with its warning labelling legistaion by using charitable funding from the Bloomberg Foundation. A lawsuit blocked the introduction of graphic warning labels in the US in 2013, following a ruling from the Court of Appeals for the DC circuit. , the US still has only the small black-and-white plain-text warnings mandated by the 1988 Alcoholic Beverage Labeling Act. These do not reflect medical research done since 1988.

By country

Australia 
In Australia, "Alcohol beverage makers must label their products with warning labels relating to the risks of drinking during pregnancy", as of 2019

Canada 
In 2017, "Alcohol can cause cancer" warning labels were added to alcoholic products at a liquor store in Yellowknife, next to existing federally-mandated 1991 warnings (about drinking while pregnant, or driving drunk). The labels were added as part of the Northern Territories Alcohol Labels Study, planned to run for eight months. Alcohol industry lobbyists stopped the study after only a few weeks, threatening to sue the Yukon government. Spirits Canada, Beer Canada and the Canadian Vintners Association alleged that the Yukon government had no legislative authority to add the labels, and would be liable for defamation, defamation, damages for lost sales, and packaging trademark and copyright infringement, because the labels had been added without their consent.

Ireland 
Backed by the Irish Cancer Society, the government of Ireland will place warning labels on alcoholic beverages, with regard to alcohol's carcinogenic properties.

Thailand 

Alcoholic beverages may not be advertised in a manner which directly or indirectly claims benefits or promotes its consumption, and may not show the product or its packaging. All advertisements must also be accompanied by one out of five predefined warning messages, lasting at least two seconds for video advertisements or occupying at least 25 percent of the advertisement area for print media.

United States 

Since 1989, in the United States, warning labels on alcoholic beverages are currently required to warn "of the risks of drinking and driving, operating machinery, drinking while pregnant, and other general health risks."

As of 2014, the current alcoholic warning message reads as follows:

See also 
 Alcohol education 
 Long-term effects of alcohol consumption
Tobacco packaging warning messages

References 

Health effects of alcohol
Packaging